Casey Woods (born May 15, 1983) is an American football coach and former player. He is currently the offensive coordinator at the Southern Methodist University. Woods played wide receiver at the University of Tennessee.

Coaching career

Early career
Immediately following his playing days, Woods moved in to a graduate assistant role with for the Tennessee Volunteers working with the wide receivers for the 2008 season.

From 2009 through 2011, Woods served as an offensive quality control coach on Gene Chizik’s Auburn staff, winning a national championship in 2010. While there, he worked closely with offensive coordinator Gus Malzahn.

Arkansas State
When Malzahn was hired as the head coach of the Arkansas State Red Wolves, he brought Woods with him to serve as his wide receivers coach and recruiting coordinator.

Return to Auburn
The following year, Malzahn was hired as the head coach at Auburn, and Woods again followed him. From 2013 to 2015, Woods served as Auburn’s director of player personnel. In those three seasons, the Tigers won 27 games, including 12 in 2013, which led to an appearance in the 2014 BCS National Championship Game.

UAB
From 2017 to 2019, Woods was a part of Bill Clark’s staff at UAB. He wore many hats, acting as the tight end’s coach, run game coordinator, and recruiting coordinator. Woods helped the 2018 team have the best offensive season in school history. The Blazers set 21 school record in 2018, including total points (418), total yards (5,680), rushing yards (2,818), total touchdowns (53), rushing touchdowns (32), single game total yards (668 vs. UTSA) and single game rushing yards (419 vs. UTSA). This led to an 11-3 record, and the school’s first-ever Conference USA championship.

Missouri
Following the success at UAB, Woods landed a job at Missouri on new head coach Eli Drinkwitz’s first staff. Woods was hired as the tight ends coach and recruiting coordinator. Woods’ recruiting efforts led the Tigers to signed their highest rated class in school history in 2021, ranking #20 by rivals.com.

SMU
In December of 2021, Woods was hired by Rhett Lashlee as the offensive coordinator for the SMU Mustangs. Woods and Lashlee previously worked together at Auburn.

Playing career
After graduating from Starkville Academy, Woods played wide receiver for the Tennessee Volunteers from 2003 to 2007. He was a three-time letterman and played in 41 games as a receiver and holder on the field goal team. He was also named a team captain for his senior season in 2007. The Volunteers won 44 games during Woods’ playing career, and had three 10-win seasons.

Personal life
A native of Starkville, MS, Woods is the son of longtime college coach Sparky Woods.
He graduated with bachelor’s degrees in psychology and political science in 2006, and with a master’s degree in sports psychology in 2008, all from the University of Tennessee. He was also a four-time Academic All-SEC selection.
Woods is married to his wife, Lauren, and the couple has four children.

References

External links

Read biography of Casey Woods

1980 births
Living people
American football wide receivers
 Tennessee Volunteers football players